Scare Yourself Alive is the third live album by the Danish rock group D-A-D. The album was released on 1 May 2006.

The album also contains a DVD with recordings of a concert at Roskilde Festival 2005 and a concert from K.B. Hallen in Copenhagen in 2005.

Track listing

CD 
 "Lawrence Of Suburbia"
 "A Good Day"
 "Isn't That Wild"
 "Scare Yourself"
 "Something Good"
 "Makin' Fun Of Money"
 "Jihad"
 "Ridin' With Sue"
 "Everything Glows"
 "Sleeping My Day Away"
 "Bad Craziness"
 "Unexplained"
 "Camping In Scandinavia"
 "Evil Twin"
 "Overmuch"
 "It's After Dark"

DVD 
Roskilde Festival July 1, 2005
 1. Lawrence Of Suburbia
 2. Scare Yourself
 3. The Roads Below Me
 4. Soft Dogs
 5. Hey Now
 6. Jihad
 7. Grow Or Pay
 8. Something Good
 9. Everything Glows
 10. Unexplained
 11. Camping In Scandinavia
 12. Bad Craziness
 13. Marlboro Man
 14. Sleeping My Day Away
 15. Laugh-N A Half
 16. Its After Dark
K.B. Hallen November 4, 2005
 17. "Isnt That Wild"
 18. "Home Alone 5"
 19. "Alright"
 20. "Makin Tons Of Money"
 21. "Jihad"
 22. "Ridin With Sue"
 23. "Hate 2 Say I Told U So"
 24. "Unexplained"
 25. "Camping In Scandinavia"
 26. "Evil Twin"
 27. "Overmuch"

+ "A Day At The Office"

External links
 This album on D-A-D's official homepage

2006 live albums
D.A.D. (band) albums